Philippe Leclerc (born 7 August 1969) is a former professional footballer who played as a central defender. He played two matches for Chamois Niortais in Ligue 2 in the 1989–90 season.

Leclerc began his career as a junior with Nancy, switching to Nantes in 1980 before returning to Nancy in 1985. He joined Chamois Niortais in 1987, but played just twice before leaving to join Poitiers in 1990.

He is currently the sporting director of Poitiers.

References

1969 births
Living people
French footballers
Association football defenders
Chamois Niortais F.C. players
Ligue 2 players
Stade Poitevin FC players
Sportspeople from Amiens
Footballers from Hauts-de-France